Ratková is a village and municipality in Revúca District in the Banská Bystrica Region of Slovakia.

References

External links
 
 

Villages and municipalities in Revúca District